Thavady is a small village in Jaffna in Northern Sri Lanka. The area is populated by people who speak Tamil.

Education
 Thavady School.

Temples
 Thavady Vinayahar Kovil
 Thavady vada paththira Kali 
 amman kovil
 Thavady Kali Kovil

See also
 Jaffna

External links
 Thavady Website

Villages in Jaffna District
Valikamam South DS Division